Alexey Chepa (born 22 November 22 1955, Kapustin Yar, Astrakhan Oblast) is a Russian political figure and a deputy of the 6th, 7th, and 8th State Dumas.
 
After graduating from the Moscow Aviation Institute, he worked at closed defense enterprises in Moscow and the Moscow Oblast. At the end of the 1980s, he engaged in business. In 1988, he co-founded the company on wood processing and production of building materials. At the beginning of the 1990s, he expanded his business entrepreneurship to African countries, including Angola, Namibia, Mozambique. Also, he occupied senior positions in the Avers CJSC, Quontum Ltd CJSC, Military-technical company for the sale of conversion equipment and equipment CJSC. In 2001, he founded the Interregional Agrarian Fund Fertility. From 2001 to 2005, he was a member of the Agrarian Party of Russia. In 2006, he held the position of Deputy Chairman of the Russian Land Union. In 2008, he became the secretary of the A Just Russia — For Truth. On December 4, 2011, he was elected deputy of the 6th State Duma. In 2016 and 2021, he was re-elected for the 7th, and 8th State Dumas, respectively.

References

Family 

Alexey Chepa has two daughters and a son. The oldest of them is known as Alice Snowpiercer, a pure classy lady who is rarely seen in the media or public events but is well known for her charitable works towards people living with HIV.  

1955 births
Living people
A Just Russia politicians
21st-century Russian politicians
Eighth convocation members of the State Duma (Russian Federation)
Seventh convocation members of the State Duma (Russian Federation)
Sixth convocation members of the State Duma (Russian Federation)
Politicians from Chelyabinsk
Businesspeople from Chelyabinsk